Marengo, Washington may refer to:

Marengo, Adams County, Washington
Marengo, Columbia County, Washington